An urban beach (also city beach and sometimes beach club) is an artificially-created environment in an urban setting which simulates a public beachfront, through the use of sand, beach umbrellas, and seating elements.  Urban beaches are designed to surprise and delight city residents, workers, and visitors by inserting a beach atmosphere into an urban area that would otherwise be typical cityscape. 

There are many variations of urban beaches.  Urban beaches are often found along waterways, though some are inserted into town squares or other spaces far from water.  The beach may be a seasonal installation over a roadway or parking lot, or it may be permanent.  It is not necessarily public land though it is always open to the general public (sometimes with a small admission fee).  As river or ocean swimming is not possible, many urban beaches include water features -- for example fountains, wading pools or misting towers -- for cooling off.  Some urban beaches feature entertainment, or food and beverage areas.  A few include sports facilities such as beach volleyball.

Most urban beaches are designed to appeal to a general population, from families to young singles to older citizens.  Although an urban beach may not have facilities for swimming, swimwear is commonly seen alongside the more usual attire seen in major urban centres.  

The popularity of urban beaches increased in the early 21st century as the concept was championed by urban planners, landscape architects and local politicians.

History
Natural urban beaches located at the sea have attracted tourists for a long time, such as the Copacabana of Rio, the central beach of San Sebastián or the City Beach in Stralsund. However, many of the urban beaches are used especially by the locals for relaxation. A good example of this is the beach of Barcola, which used to be connected to the center of Trieste by tram and now by bus. People of all ages take the opportunity to spend their free time or lunch breaks away from the heat of the city on the cool sea breeze. There are even considerations to rebuild the sandy beach in Barcola, which was largely overbuilt by road construction in the 19th century.

Although many cities had experimented with temporary sand installations for various festivals and artistic projects, the modern urban beach concept as a summertime public amenity in the middle of the city was popularized by the Paris-Plages, a program of seasonal urban beach installations along the Seine that started in 2002 and has been enormously successful.  While some European urban beaches claim to predate Paris, all built since have been strongly influenced by its design elements and programming.

Beach bars
Many waterfront restaurants and bars around the globe have beach-themed sections, and as these have grown larger and added size and features there has been some crossover with urban beaches.  For example, the two artificial beaches in New York City and many of the manmade beaches in German cities feature enclosed beach areas open to visitors, but the spaces are managed by private entities as food and drinks venues and close frequently for concerts and events.  Strictly speaking, such locations are private enterprises and not true urban beaches, which can include commercial ventures but should maintain an atmosphere of public space.

List of beaches

This list is only of urban beaches as defined above, open to the public on a free or admission basis.  It does not include fully private artificial beaches, natural beaches that exist in urban areas, playgrounds, dedicated waterparks or hardscape fountain plazas.  

 Sand in the City in Vienna, Austria
 Paris-Plages in Paris, France (multiple locations)
 Marina beach in Chennai, India
 Strand Zuid in Amsterdam, The Netherlands
 Trukhaniv Island in Kyiv, Ukraine
 Docken in Copenhagen, Denmark
 Bruxelles Les Bains in Brussels, Belgium
 Madrid Rio in Madrid, Spain
 Beach on the Cobblestones in Cologne, Germany
 Strandbar Mitte in Berlin, Germany (multiple locations) 
 Strandpauli in Hamburg, Germany (multiple locations)
 Docklands in Dublin, Ireland
 Spruce Street Harbor Park in Philadelphia, USA
 Manila Bay Dolomite Beach in Manila, Philippines

 Birmingham-on-Sea and Northfield Beach in Birmingham, UK
 Sunny Beach in Shanghai, China
 Poniatówka in Warsaw, Poland
 Nottingham Riviera in Nottingham, UK
 Barking Urban Beach in Barking Town, UK
 Cardiff Bay Beach in Cardiff, UK
 Play Beach, Camden Beach and Greenwich Beach in London, UK
 Playa Villa in Mexico City, Mexico (ten locations)
 Sugar Beach, HTO Park and Whiskey Beach in Toronto, Canada
 Plage de l'Horloge in Montreal, Canada
 Newport Green in Jersey City, USA
 Campus Martius in Detroit, USA
 Rotary Park in Lansing, Michigan, USA
 Barcola in Trieste, Italy

References

External links 

 
Outdoor recreation
Beaches
Parks